The 2000–01 New York Rangers season was the franchise's 75th season. The Rangers compiled a 33–43–5–1 record in the regular season, finishing in fourth place in the Atlantic Division. New York's 10th-place finish in the Eastern Conference left it out of the 2001 Stanley Cup playoffs; it was the fourth consecutive season the team missed the postseason.

The season saw several new faces join the team. Glen Sather, the longtime Edmonton Oilers executive, was brought in to be team president and general manager. Ron Low was hired as the team's head coach. Former team captain Mark Messier returned to the Rangers after spending the previous three seasons with the Vancouver Canucks and resumed his place as team captain.

Regular season

The Rangers allowed the most goals during the regular season, with 290. They also scored the most short-handed goals, with 16.

Final standings

Schedule and results

|- align="center" bgcolor="#CCFFCC"
| 1 || 7 || @ Atlanta Thrashers || 2–1 ||W|| 1–0–0–0
|- align="center" bgcolor="#CCFFCC"
| 2 || 11 || Montreal Canadiens || 3–1 ||W|| 2–0–0–0
|- align="center" bgcolor="#FFBBBB"
| 3 || 14 || @ Pittsburgh Penguins || 8–6 ||L|| 2–1–0–0
|- align="center" bgcolor="#FFBBBB"
| 4 || 16 || Mighty Ducks of Anaheim || 4–3 ||L|| 2–2–0–0
|- align="center" bgcolor="#CCFFCC"
| 5 || 18 || @ Chicago Blackhawks || 4–2 ||W|| 3–2–0–0
|- align="center" bgcolor="#FFBBBB"
| 6 || 22 || Tampa Bay Lightning || 4–2 ||L|| 3–3–0–0
|- align="center" bgcolor="#FFBBBB"
| 7 || 24 || Philadelphia Flyers || 5–4 ||L|| 3–4–0–0
|- align="center" bgcolor="#FFBBBB"
| 8 || 26 || @ Philadelphia Flyers || 3–0 ||L|| 3–5–0–0
|- align="center" bgcolor="#FFBBBB"
| 9 || 27 || Pittsburgh Penguins || 4–1 ||L|| 3–6–0–0
|- align="center" bgcolor="#CCFFCC"
| 10 || 29 || Boston Bruins || 5–1 ||W|| 4–6–0–0
|-

|- align="center" bgcolor="#CCFFCC"
| 11 || 1 || Tampa Bay Lightning || 6–1 ||L|| 5–6–0–0
|- align="center" bgcolor="#FFBBBB"
| 12 || 2 || @ Ottawa Senators || 6–5 ||L|| 5–7–0–0
|- align="center" bgcolor="#CCFFCC"
| 13 || 4 || @ Montreal Canadiens || 5–2 ||W|| 6–7–0–0
|- align="center" bgcolor="#CCFFCC"
| 14 || 7 || Edmonton Oilers || 4–3 ||W|| 7–7–0–0
|- align="center" bgcolor="#CCFFCC"
| 15 || 9 || @ Washington Capitals || 5–3 ||W|| 8–7–0–0
|- align="center" bgcolor="#FFBBBB"
| 16 || 12 || Phoenix Coyotes || 2–0 ||L|| 8–8–0–0
|- align="center" bgcolor="#CCFFCC"
| 17 || 15 || @ Minnesota Wild || 3–2 ||W|| 9–8–0–0
|- align="center" bgcolor="#FFBBBB"
| 18 || 17 || @ Vancouver Canucks || 4–3 ||L|| 9–9–0–0
|- align="center" bgcolor="#CCFFCC"
| 19 || 18 || @ Calgary Flames || 5–4 OT ||W|| 10–9–0–0
|- align="center" bgcolor="#FFBBBB"
| 20 || 21 || Toronto Maple Leafs || 3–1 ||L|| 10–10–0–0
|- align="center" bgcolor="#CCFFCC"
| 21 || 22 || @ New York Islanders || 4–3 OT ||W|| 11–10–0–0
|- align="center" bgcolor="#FFBBBB"
| 22 || 24 || @ Buffalo Sabres || 3–2 ||L|| 11–11–0–0
|- align="center" bgcolor="#CCFFCC"
| 23 || 26 || Ottawa Senators || 3–2 ||W|| 12–11–0–0
|- align="center" bgcolor="#CCFFCC"
| 24 || 28 || Los Angeles Kings || 7–6 ||W|| 13–11–0–0
|- align="center" bgcolor="#FFBBBB"
| 25 || 29 || @ New Jersey Devils || 5–2 ||L|| 13–12–0–0
|-

|- align="center" bgcolor="#FFBBBB"
| 26 || 2 || @ Toronto Maple Leafs || 8–2 ||L|| 13–13–0–0
|- align="center" bgcolor="#FFBBBB"
| 27 || 3 || Colorado Avalanche || 6–3 ||L|| 13–14–0–0
|- align="center" bgcolor="#CCFFCC"
| 28 || 6 || Washington Capitals || 3–2 ||W|| 14–14–0–0
|- align="center" bgcolor="#CCFFCC"
| 29 || 8 || Buffalo Sabres || 5–2 ||W|| 15–14–0–0
|- align="center" bgcolor="#FFBBBB"
| 30 || 9 || @ Boston Bruins || 6–4 ||L|| 15–15–0–0
|- align="center" bgcolor="#FFBBBB"
| 31 || 12 || @ San Jose Sharks || 3–2 ||L|| 15–16–0–0
|- align="center" bgcolor="white"
| 32 || 14 || @ Los Angeles Kings || 5–5 OT ||T|| 15–16–1–0
|- align="center" bgcolor="#FFBBBB"
| 33 || 15 || @ Mighty Ducks of Anaheim || 6–4 ||L|| 15–17–1–0
|- align="center" bgcolor="#CCFFCC"
| 34 || 18 || Florida Panthers || 6–3 ||W|| 16–17–1–0
|- align="center" bgcolor="#FFBBBB"
| 35 || 20 || St. Louis Blues || 6–3 ||L|| 16–18–1–0
|- align="center" bgcolor="#FF6F6F"
| 36 || 23 || Nashville Predators || 3–2 OT ||OTL|| 16–18–1–1
|- align="center" bgcolor="#FFBBBB"
| 37 || 27 || @ Carolina Hurricanes || 4–3 ||L||16–19–1–1
|- align="center" bgcolor="#FFBBBB"
| 38 || 28 || Atlanta Thrashers || 4–1 ||L|| 16–20–1–1
|- align="center" bgcolor="#FFBBBB"
| 39 || 31 || @ Dallas Stars || 6–1 ||L|| 16–21–1–1
|-

|- align="center" bgcolor="#FFBBBB"
| 40 || 4 || @ Phoenix Coyotes || 3–1 ||L||16–22–1–1
|- align="center" bgcolor="white"
| 41 || 6 || New Jersey Devils || 5–5 OT ||T|| 16–22–2–1
|- align="center" bgcolor="#FFBBBB"
| 42 || 8 || Dallas Stars || 2–1 ||L||16–23–2–1
|- align="center" bgcolor="#FFBBBB"
| 43 || 13 || @ Boston Bruins || 4–1 ||L|| 16–24–2–1
|- align="center" bgcolor="#CCFFCC"
| 44 || 14 || Minnesota Wild || 4–2 ||W|| 17–24–2–1
|- align="center" bgcolor="#CCFFCC"
| 45 || 16 || Philadelphia Flyers || 4–3 OT ||W|| 18–24–2–1
|- align="center" bgcolor="#CCFFCC"
| 46 || 18 || Toronto Maple Leafs || 2–1 OT ||W|| 19–24–2–1
|- align="center" bgcolor="white"
| 47 || 20 || @ Montreal Canadiens || 2–2 OT ||T|| 19–24–3–1
|- align="center" bgcolor="#CCFFCC"
| 48 || 22 || @ Carolina Hurricanes || 5–2 ||W|| 20–24–3–1
|- align="center" bgcolor="#FFBBBB"
| 49 || 24 || Carolina Hurricanes || 3–2 ||L|| 20–25–3–1
|- align="center" bgcolor="#FFBBBB"
| 50 || 26 || New York Islanders || 3–2 ||L|| 20–26–3–1
|- align="center" bgcolor="#FFBBBB"
| 51 || 27 || @ Toronto Maple Leafs || 3–1 ||L|| 20–27–3–1
|- align="center" bgcolor="#FFBBBB"
| 52 || 29 || Atlanta Thrashers || 7–2 ||L|| 20–28–3–1
|- align="center" bgcolor="#CCFFCC"
| 53 || 31 || Montreal Canadiens || 4–2 ||W|| 21–28–3–1
|-

|- align="center" bgcolor="#FFBBBB"
| 54 || 6 || Buffalo Sabres || 6–3 ||L|| 21–29–3–1
|- align="center" bgcolor="#CCFFCC"
| 55 || 9 || @ Florida Panthers || 4–2 ||W|| 22–29–3–1
|- align="center" bgcolor="white"
| 56 || 11 || New Jersey Devils || 1–1 OT ||T|| 22–29–4–1
|- align="center" bgcolor="#CCFFCC"
| 57 || 12 || @ Columbus Blue Jackets || 4–3 ||W|| 23–29–4–1
|- align="center" bgcolor="#CCFFCC"
| 58 || 17 || @ Tampa Bay Lightning || 5–4 ||W|| 24–29–4–1
|- align="center" bgcolor="#CCFFCC"
| 59 || 19 || Chicago Blackhawks || 4–2 ||W|| 25–29–4–1
|- align="center" bgcolor="#FFBBBB"
| 60 || 23 || @ Pittsburgh Penguins || 6–4 ||L|| 25–30–4–1
|- align="center" bgcolor="#FFBBBB"
| 61 || 25 || @ Philadelphia Flyers || 2–1 ||L|| 25–31–4–1
|- align="center" bgcolor="#FFBBBB"
| 62 || 26 || Ottawa Senators || 3–2 ||L|| 25–32–4–1
|- align="center" bgcolor="#CCFFCC"
| 63 || 28 || Florida Panthers || 4–2 ||W|| 26–32–4–1
|-

|- align="center" bgcolor="#FFBBBB"
| 64 || 2 || Pittsburgh Penguins || 7–5 ||L|| 26–33–4–1
|- align="center" bgcolor="#FFBBBB"
| 65 || 4 || @ Nashville Predators || 5–2 ||L|| 26–34–4–1
|- align="center" bgcolor="#FFBBBB"
| 66 || 5 || New York Islanders || 5–2 ||L|| 26–35–4–1
|- align="center" bgcolor="#FFBBBB"
| 67 || 9 || @ Washington Capitals || 5–3 ||L|| 26–36–4–1
|- align="center" bgcolor="#CCFFCC"
| 68 || 10 || @ Ottawa Senators || 3–2 ||W|| 27–36–4–1
|- align="center" bgcolor="white"
| 69 || 12 || Pittsburgh Penguins || 3–3 OT ||T|| 27–36–5–1
|- align="center" bgcolor="#FFBBBB"
| 70 || 14 || @ Buffalo Sabres || 6–3 ||L|| 27–37–5–1
|- align="center" bgcolor="#FFBBBB"
| 71 || 17 || @ Philadelphia Flyers || 2–1 ||L|| 27–38–5–1
|- align="center" bgcolor="#CCFFCC"
| 72 || 19 || Washington Capitals || 6–3 ||W|| 28–38–5–1
|- align="center" bgcolor="#FFBBBB"
| 73 || 21 || @ New Jersey Devils || 4–0 ||L|| 28–39–5–1
|- align="center" bgcolor="#FFBBBB"
| 74 || 24 || Detroit Red Wings || 6–0 ||L|| 28–40–5–1
|- align="center" bgcolor="#FFBBBB"
| 75 || 25 || Boston Bruins || 3–2 ||L|| 28–41–5–1
|- align="center" bgcolor="#CCFFCC"
| 76 || 28 || New York Islanders || 4–2 ||W|| 29–41–5–1
|- align="center" bgcolor="#CCFFCC"
| 77 || 29 || @ New York Islanders || 6–4 ||W|| 30–41–5–1
|- align="center" bgcolor="#CCFFCC"
| 78 || 31 || @ New Jersey Devils || 4–3 ||W|| 31–41–5–1
|-

|- align="center" bgcolor="#CCFFCC"
| 79 || 1 || @ Atlanta Thrashers || 4–2 ||W|| 32–41–5–1
|- align="center" bgcolor="#FFBBBB"
| 80 || 4 || Carolina Hurricanes || 3–1 ||L|| 32–42–5–1
|- align="center" bgcolor="#CCFFCC"
| 81 || 5 || @ Tampa Bay Lightning || 4–3 OT ||W|| 33–42–5–1
|- align="center" bgcolor="#FFBBBB"
| 82 || 7 || @ Florida Panthers || 3–0 ||L|| 33–43–5–1
|-

Player statistics
Skaters

Goaltenders

†Denotes player spent time with another team before joining Rangers. Stats reflect time with Rangers only.
‡Traded mid-season. Stats reflect time with Rangers only.

Draft picks
New York's picks at the 2000 NHL Entry Draft in Calgary, Alberta, Canada at the Pengrowth Saddledome.

References

New York Rangers seasons
New York Rangers
New York Rangers
New York Rangers
New York Rangers
 in Manhattan
Madison Square Garden